Anne Mee, née Foldsone (1765–1851) was a prolific English miniature painter of the late 18th and early 19th centuries.

Life
The eldest child of John Foldsone, she was educated at Madame Pomier's school in Queen Square, Bloomsbury, London. She began to paint at age 12, with tuition from George Romney, and after her father died in 1784, did so to support her family.

Anne Mee exhibited occasionally at the Royal Academy between 1815 and 1837. She died at Hammersmith, 28 May 1851.

Family
Anne Foldsone married Joseph Mee, an Irish barrister from Armagh, in 1793; they had six children. A son, Arthur Patrick Mee, practised as an architect, and exhibited at the Royal Academy from 1824 to 1837.

Career

As Miss Foldsone, she received royal and aristocratic patronage; and Horace Walpole, in his letters to Mary Berry of 1790–1, mentioned that she was at Windsor, painting the princesses. The Prince Regent gave Anne Mee employment in painting portraits of fashionable beauties, and many of these pictures went to Windsor. Some of her portraits were engraved for the Court Magazine, La Belle Assemblée, and similar periodicals. In 1812 she started a serial publication, Gallery of Beauties of the Court of George III, with her own portrait at the front, but just one number was issued.

Selected work

Miniatures 
 Mrs. Mary Robinson (ca. 1790) 
 Portrait of a Woman, Said to Be Lady Sophia Boyle (ca. 1790)
 Portrait of a Woman, Possibly Barbara (1768-1829), Marchioness of Donegall (ca. 1790)
 Portrait of Lord Dugannon (ca. 1791-1899)
 Portrait Miniature of Frances, Countess of Dartmouth (ca. 1791-1899) 
 Portrait Miniature of Princess Amelia (ca. 1791-1899)
 Anne Mee (ca. 1795)
 Elizabeth Boughton, Lady Templetown (1795-1800)
 George Stewart 8th Earl of Galloway (1795-1812)
 Lady Jane Halliday (1796)
 Lady Margaret Janet Fordyce (later Lady Margaret Burges) (18th century)
 Lady Hammond (late 18th - early 19th century) 
 A Young Man, Thought to Be One of the Artist's Sons (late 18th - early 19th century)
 A Young Man, Thought to Be One of the Artist's Sons (late 18th - early 19th century)
 A Man, Thought to Be Joseph Mee (ca. 1800-1850)
 Lady Jersey (ca. 1800-1850)
 Lady Catherine Bligh, Lady Charles Stewart (ca. 1804-1865)
 An Unknown Lady in a White Dress (ca. 1805-1810) 
 Isabella, Marchioness of Hertford (ca. 1812-1814)
 Anne Katherine MacDonnell, 2nd Countess of Antrim (ca. 1817-1818)
 Louisa Barbara Catherine Philips, Countess of Lichfield (1819)
 Miss Elliott (1825)
 Susan, Lady Carbery (1828)
 Lady Harriet Elizabeth Georgiana Howard, Countess Gower, later Duchess of Sutherland (ca.1828)
 William Craven, 1st Earl of Craven (19th century)
 Charlotte Townshend (before 1851) 
 Anne 'Nanette' Hawkins, Lady Crewe (date unknown)
Sir George Crewe, 8th Bt. as a Child (date unknown)
 Thomas William Anson, 1st Earl of Lichfield, PC, MP  (date unknown)
 Two Children Embracing (date unknown)
 Portrait of a Lady Wearing a Turban (date unknown)
 Lt. Col. Thomas Grosvenor (date unknown)
 Lady Anne Barnard (date unknown)

Prints after Anne Mee 
 Duchess of Rutland (ca. 1787-1813), engraving by Anthony Cardon  
 Mary Berry (1790), engraving by Henry Adlard  
 Mrs. Anne Murray Keith (1793-1857), engraving by Samuel Freeman 
 Fanny Crosbie (ca. 1796-1854), engraving by Maxim Gauci 
 Frances Marchioness of Bute (1800–1814), engraving by Caroline Watson 
 Mary Isabella Dutchess of Rutland (1804), engraving by Charles Turner 
 Rt. Hon. Maria Letitia Countess Manvers (ca. 1804-1850), engraving by James Thomson 
 Princess Sophia (1806), drawing by Henry Bone 
 Emily Charlotte Chambers (ca. 1808), engraving by Henry Hoppner Meyer
 Princess Amelia (1810), engraving by John Samuel Agar 
 Anne Caulfeild, Countess of Charlemont (1812), engraving by John Samuel Agar
 Charlotte Ashburnham, Countess of Ashburnham when Viscountess St Asaph (1812), engraving by Niccolò Schiavonetti, published by Anne Mee  
 Charlotte Sophia, Duchess of Beaufort (1812), engraving by Anthony Cardon
 Charles Manners, 4th Duke of Rutland (1812), engraving by Anthony Cardon
 Jane Dalrymple-Hamilton (1812), engraving by John Samuel Agar
 Katherine Sophia, Lady Heathcote (1812), engraving by John Samuel Agar, published by Anne Mee 
 Mary Isabella Dutchess of Rutland (1812), engraving by Anthony Cardon
 Mrs. Mee (1812), engraving by Henry Hoppner Meyer  
 Anne Caulfeild, Countess of Charlemont (1814), drawing by Henry Bone 
 Lady Frances Anne Maude, Viscountess Hawarden (early 19th century), engraving by Henry Hoppner Meyer 
 Anne Mee (1814), engraving by Henry Richard Cook 
 Isabella Horatia, Lady Ravensworth, and her daughter (1816-1887), engraving by Samuel Cousins
 Mrs. Mee (ca. 1819), engraving by Henry Richard Cook, used as a frontispiece for an 1819 edition of Frances Burney's Cecilia 
 Harriet Elizabeth Georgiana Leveson-Gower, Duchess of Sutherland (1820), drawing by Henry Bone
 Richard Grenville, 2nd Duke of Buckingham and Chandos (1821), engraving by Robert Cooper 
 William Beauchamp Lygon, 2nd Earl Beauchamp (1822), engraving by Edward Scriven 
 Richard Grenville Plantagenet Temple, Marquis of Chandos (1822-1839), engraving by Samuel Freeman 
 Harriet Anne Chichester, Marchioness of Donegall (1823), engraving by James Thomson
 Arthur Algernon Earl of Essex (ca. 1825), engraving by Jean Alexandre Allais 
 Rt. Hon. Maria Letitia Countess Manvers (1827), engraving by James Thomson
 The Rt Hon Henrietta Viscountess Dillon (1828), engraving by James Thomson 
 The Rt. Hon. Lady Anne Beckett (1829), engraving by James Thomson
 The Rt. Hon. Lady Anne Beckett (1829), engraving by Thomas Wright
 The Rt Honble Lady Isabella Anne Brydges (ca. 1830-1850), engraving by James Thomson
 Louisa Catherine Osborne, Duchess of Leeds when Marchioness of Carmarthen (1828-1838), engraving by James Thomson
 The Rt Honble Lady Isabella Anne Brydges (ca. 1830-1850), engraving by James Thomson
 Corisande Armandine, Countess of Tankerville (1833), engraving by John Cochran
 Mrs. George Lane Fox (ca. 1833), engraving by James Thomson, illustration to The Portrait Gallery of Distinguished Females (1833) 
 The Rt Honble Anne Catherine Macdonel Countess of Antrim (1834), engraving by Henry Richard Cook 
 Mary Marchioness of Downshire Baroness of Sandys (ca. 1835-1854), lithograph by Maxim Gauci
 Right Honble Lady Emily Esther Anne Hesketh (1837), engraving by John Cochran
 Lady Elizabeth Reynell (1837), engraved by Daniel John Pound, illustration for The Court Magazine (1837)  
 Lady Frances Anne Agar, Viscountess Hawarden, engraving by Henry Hoppner Meyer

Publications of work 
 The Portrait Gallery of Distinguished Females, Including Beauties of the Courts of George IV. and William IV. 2 vols. London: Edward Bull, 1833.

Notes

Attribution

1765 births
1851 deaths
18th-century English painters
19th-century English painters
18th-century English women artists
19th-century English women artists
English women painters
English portrait painters